Mount Tambuyukon or Tamboyukon is a mountain located at the West Coast Division of Sabah, Malaysia.

Geology 
The glaciated summit plateaus and Pleistocene glacial tills of the Kinabalu area including similar deposits near to Mount Tambuyukon indicate that the summits of Tambuyukon, Kinabalu and possibly Trusmadi were significantly higher than other parts of the Crocker Range by the Pleistocene. Together with Mount Kinabalu, it is part of the Wariu Formation.

Biodiversity 
The mountain supports a wide range of unique flora and fauna, including a number of pitcher plant species of the genus Nepenthes.

Features 
There are two climbing trails towards the mountain summit, one from Monggis Village and the other from Sabah Parks substation with permission from the park authority needing to be obtained before the climbing. The mountain is considered one of Sabah's ecotourism destination.

References

External links 
 

Tambuyukon
Protected areas of Sabah
Hiking trails in Malaysia
Tambuyukon
West Coast Division
Borneo montane rain forests